Pocosin Fork is a stream in the U.S. state of West Virginia.

The creek most likely derives its name from the word pocosin (or poquosin) a type of marsh.

See also
List of rivers of West Virginia

References

Rivers of Mercer County, West Virginia
Rivers of West Virginia